Monuments is a compilation album by the German power metal band Edguy, released on 14 July 2017. The album was released as a two-CD/DVD package including 22 previously released songs, five new songs, and one previously unreleased song originally recorded in 1995 for the demo version of The Savage Poetry. The package also includes a two-hour DVD and a photobook. Frontman Tobias Sammet wrote two of the new songs on his own, while guitarists Jens Ludwig, Dirk Sauer and bassist Tobias Exxel co-wrote each of the other three.

Track listing

Live DVD
 "Mysteria"
 "Under the Moon"
 "Navigator"
 "Wake Up the King"
 "Land of the Miracle"
 "Lavatory Love Machine"
 "Vain Glory Opera"
 "Fallen Angels"
 "The Piper Never Dies"
 "Babylon"
 "King of Fools"
 "Chalice of Agony" (Avantasia cover featuring André Matos)
 "Tears of the Mandrake"
 "Out of Control"

Video clips
 "Love Tyger"
 "Robin Hood"
 "Two Out of Seven"
 "Ministry of Saints"
 "Superheroes"
 "Lavatory Love Machine"
 "King of Fools"
 "All the Clowns"

Charts

References

External links
Official Edguy site

2017 compilation albums
Edguy albums
Nuclear Blast compilation albums